In Ohio, State Route 675 may refer to:
Interstate 675 in Ohio, the only Ohio highway numbered 675 since about 1962
Ohio State Route 675 (1930s-1960s), now SR 685